Henry Ljungmann (born 3 December 1897, date of death unknown) was a Norwegian ski jumper who has competed in the 1920s. He won a silver medal in the individual large hill at the 1925 FIS Nordic World Ski Championships in Johannisbad.

External links

Norwegian male ski jumpers
1897 births
Year of death missing
FIS Nordic World Ski Championships medalists in ski jumping